The 2012–13 season was Burton Albion's fourth consecutive season in the League Two, having finished 17th in the 2011–12 season. The season marked Gary Rowett's first full season in management with the club, having been appointed on a full-time basis on 11 May. His reign started with the club's first ever League Cup victory with a 5–4 penalty defeat of Sheffield United at Bramall Lane.

Key events

May
 9 May: Albion begin preparations for the new season by releasing five first-team players; James Wren, Kristian Ramsey-Dixon, Danny Blanchett, Andres Gurrieri and Patrick Ada. Jack Dyer and Adi Yussuf both sign one-year contract extensions.
 11 May: Gary Rowett is announced as the club's full-time manager following a spell in caretaker charge alongside Kevin Poole, who is retained as goalkeeping coach.
 15 May: Albion release four more players; Adam Bolder, Ryan Austin, Tony James and Greg Pearson, whilst Nathan Stanton and Aaron Webster both sign one-year contract extensions.
 18 May: Albion unveil Kevin Summerfield as the club's new assistant manager.
 24 May: Rowett names former Swindon Town scout Paul Molesworth as the club's chief scout.
 24 May: Rowett makes his first move in the transfer market, by signing ex-Tranmere Rovers midfielder Robbie Weir on a free transfer. The 23-year-old Northern Irishman joins on a two-year deal.

June
 5 June: Scotsman Zander Diamond becomes Albion's second summer signing, joining on a free transfer for Oldham Athletic.
 13 June: Round One of the 2012–13 League Cup is drawn. For the fourth successive year, Albion are drawn away from home, this time against Sheffield United.
 18 June: The fixtures for the League Two 2012–13 season are released. Albion's first game is against Rotherham United in the first game ever played at their New York Stadium.
 27 June: Albion's third signing of the summer is left-back Damien McCrory. The former Dagenham & Redbridge defender signs a two-year contract with the Brewers.

July
 16 July: Albion sign former Rochdale defender Marcus Holness on a two-year deal.
 27 July: Albion complete a double-deal to sign goalkeepers Dean Lyness and Ross Atkins. Lyness joins on a free transfer from Kidderminster Harriers whilst Atkins returns to the club for a second season-long loan spell from Derby County.
 31 July: Albion re-sign midfielder Lee Bell on a free transfer from recently promoted Crewe Alexandra. Bell has had two previous loan spells with the Brewers and signs a one-year contract.

August
 11 August: Albion begin their season with a 5–4 penalty shootout defeat of Sheffield United, after a 2–2 draw during normal time. This represented the club's first ever victory in a League Cup game. Adi Yussuf scores the club's first goal of the season.
 15 August: Round Two of the 2012–13 League Cup is drawn. Albion are again drawn away from home, this time against Leicester City. Albion also complete the signings of striker Matt Paterson on a free transfer from Southend United and defender Anthony O'Connor on a one-month loan deal from Blackburn Rovers.
 18 August: Albion begin their League Two by being defeated 3–0 by Rotherham United. Round One of the 2012–13 Johnstone's Paint Trophy is drawn. Albion are drawn away from home against recently relegated Coventry City.
 28 August: Albion continue their League Cup success with a 4–2 away victory over Leicester City at the King Power Stadium. The Brewers will be competing in the third round of the competition for the first time.
 30 August: Round Three of the 2012–13 League Cup is drawn. For the sixth consecutive game in the competition Albion are drawn away from home. This time the opposition will be Bradford City. Also on this day, Billy Kee puts pen to paper on a new three-year contract, that will see him stay with the club until 2015.

September
 3 September: Billy Kee is called up to the Northern Ireland Under 21 side for the Under 21 European Championship qualifying games against Macedonia and Denmark.
 4 September: Albion are knocked out of the Johnstone's Paint Trophy by Coventry City after a 10–9 penalty shootout defeat. The Brewers had held the League One side to a 0–0 during the 90 minutes, but missed penalties from Marcus Holness and Dean Lyness left the club still without a win in the competition after four years of trying.
 7 September: Albion sign goalkeeper Stuart Tomlinson on a four-month deal from local rivals Port Vale.
 12 September: Full-back Anthony O'Connor's loan deal is extended by five months to 31 January 2013.
 14 September: Academy graduates Evan Garnett and Jack Green sign three-month loan deals with Hucknall Town.
 25 September: Albion are knocked out of the League Cup in the 3rd Round by Bradford City. The Brewers lose 3–2 after extra time despite leading the game going into the 90th minute.
 28 September: Gary Rowett makes completes the emergency loan signings of Rob Kiernan and Luke Rooney on one-month deals from Wigan Athletic and Swindon Town respectively.

October
 18 October: BBC Sport announce the findings of their Price of Football survey, with Burton being named as the cheapest place to watch football in nPower League Two. Gillingham are named as the most expensive for the season.
 21 October: The first round proper of the FA Cup is drawn. Burton are given a home tie against Conference North side Altrincham. The game will be played on Sunday 4 November due to a stewarding clash with the Derby County home fixture against Blackpool on Saturday 3 November.
 23 October: Albion sign winger Jordan Chapell on an emergency one-month loan deal from Sheffield United. The new signing makes an immediate impact later in the day by marking his debut appearance with a goal against Port Vale. Albion also announce that the away fixture with Plymouth Argyle at Home Park is to be delayed by 24 hours to Wednesday 7 November due to both clubs' participation in the FA Cup.
 26 October: The Brewers sign goalkeeper Mark Oxley on a one-month loan deal from Hull City following injuries to regular keeper Stuart Tomlinson and deputy Ross Atkins. Also on this day striker Matt Paterson signs a six-month extension to his current deal to see him through to the end of the season.

November
 4 November: The second round proper of the FA Cup is drawn. Burton are given an away tie against Crewe Alexandra. However they will first have to overcome Altrincham in a First Round replay on 13 November at Moss Lane, having only managed a 3–3 draw against their Conference North opponents at home.
 15 November: Burton confirm their place in the second round of the FA Cup with a 2–0 over Altrincham at Moss Lane, setting up an away tie with Crewe Alexandra at Gresty Road. The club also announce that local businessman Ian English makes his return to the board of directors.
 20 November: The Brewers take 20-year-old striker Jacob Blyth on a loan deal from Leicester City until 12 January 2013.
 21 November: Jordan Chapell's loan spell from Sheffield United is extended by a further month. This will see the midfielder stay with the Brewers until 23 December.

December
 1 December: The Brewers defeat Crewe Alexandra 1–0 in the second round proper of the FA Cup at the Alexandra Stadium. The Brewers will now play in the third round proper for the first time in two seasons.
 2 December: The third round proper of the FA Cup is drawn. In a repeat of the second round of the Capital One Cup, the Brewers are drawn away at Championship side Leicester City.
 4 December: Sheffield United loanee Jordan Chapell is recalled from his loan spell with the Brewers by his parent club. The winger had originally been due to stay with the Brewers until 23 December.

Squad statistics

Appearances and goals
Updated 10 December 2012

|-
|colspan="14"|Players played for Burton on loan who have returned to their parent club:

|}

Top scorers
Updated 10 December 2012

Disciplinary record
Updated 10 December 2012

Club

Coaching and medical staff

Last updated 22 August 2012.
Source: 
Includes staff currently registered with club only.

Gary Rowett was named as the club's permanent manager on 11 May 2012, becoming the 30th manager in the club's history. This followed his tenure as caretaker manager after the sacking of the previous manager Paul Peschisolido. Kevin Poole and Mark Sale were retained in their respective roles as goalkeeping coach and youth team coach. Former Tranmere Rovers number two Kevin Summerfield is named as the club's new assistant manager, and Paul Molesworth is named as the club's new chief scout.

Players
Updated 10 December 2012.

Source: Burton Albion, Soccerbase
Ordered by position then squad number. Appearances (starts and substitute appearances) and goals include those in competitive matches in The Football League, The Football Conference, FA Cup, League Cup, Football League Trophy, FA Trophy and Conference League Cup for Burton Albion.
Notes
1 Appearances include previous loan spell in 2011–12.
2 Club Captain.
3 Appearances and goals include two previous loan spells.
4 Undisclosed fee reported by the Burton Mail to be £20K.
5 Appearances include previous loan spell in 2008.
6 Player/Goalkeeping coach. Oldest registered player in The Football League. Re-registered as player on 26 October 2012 due to injuries to Mark Oxley and Stuart Tomlinson.

Kit

|
|
|

Burton's home kit was retained from the previous season, as was the Mr. Cropper sponsorship brand. TAG Leisure continue to manufacture the club's matchday and training attire. The new away kit was revealed on 14 July before the pre-season friendly with Aston Villa. It marks a return to the blue shirts, shorts and socks adopted by the team during the 2009 Conference National title-winning season. It will remain in use until the end of the 2013–14 league season.

Other information

Results

Pre-season friendlies

League Two

League Two results summary

Results by round

FA Cup

League Cup

Johnstone's Paint Trophy

Birmingham Senior Cup
Appearances and goals not included in club statistics.

Transfers

References

Burton Albion F.C. seasons
Burton Albion